The 1959 All England Championships was a badminton tournament held at Wembley, London, England, from 18 to 21 March 1959.

Final results

Results

Men's singles

Section 1

Section 2

Women's singles

Section 1

Section 2

+Denotes seed

References

All England Open Badminton Championships
All England
All England Open Badminton Championships in London
All England Badminton Championships
All England Badminton Championships
All England Badminton Championships